The canton of Couserans Est is an administrative division of the Ariège department, southern France. It was created at the French canton reorganisation which came into effect in March 2015. Its seat is in La Bastide-de-Sérou.

It consists of the following communes:
 
Aigues-Juntes
Aleu
Allières
Alos
Alzen
Aulus-les-Bains
La Bastide-de-Sérou
Biert
Boussenac
Cadarcet
Castelnau-Durban
Clermont
Couflens
Durban-sur-Arize
Encourtiech
Ercé
Erp
Esplas-de-Sérou
Lacourt
Larbont
Lescure
Massat
Montagagne
Montels
Montseron
Nescus
Oust
Le Port
Rimont
Rivèrenert
Seix
Sentenac-d'Oust
Sentenac-de-Sérou
Soueix-Rogalle
Soulan
Suzan
Ustou

References

Cantons of Ariège (department)